Carlos John Moorhead (May 5, 1922 – November 23, 2011) was a United States Congressman from California. Born in Long Beach, he attended the public schools of Glendale, graduated from Herbert Hoover High School (Glendale) in 1940 and earned a B.A. from the UCLA in 1943 and a J.D. from the University of Southern California Law School in 1949. He served in the United States Army from 1942 to 1945 and attained the rank of lieutenant colonel.

Moorhead was admitted to the California State Bar in 1949 and commenced practice in Glendale; he was admitted to practice before the United States Supreme Court in 1973, and was a member of the California Law Revision Commission. From 1967 to 1973, he was a member of the California State Assembly for the 43rd district, and was elected as a Republican to the 93rd and to the eleven succeeding Congresses, serving from January 3, 1973, to January 3, 1997. He was best known for supporting President Richard Nixon during impeachment hearings, voting ‘no’ on all three articles of impeachment. He was not a candidate for reelection to the 105th Congress. He died after a long battle with Alzheimer's disease in 2011.

References

External links

Carlos John Moorhead entry at The Political Graveyard
 
Join California Carlos J. Moorhead

1922 births
2011 deaths
United States Army personnel of World War II
California lawyers
Deaths from dementia in California
Deaths from Alzheimer's disease
Republican Party members of the California State Assembly
United States Army colonels
University of California, Los Angeles alumni
USC Gould School of Law alumni
Republican Party members of the United States House of Representatives from California
20th-century American politicians
People from Glendale, California
People from Long Beach, California
20th-century American lawyers
Military personnel from California